Nathaniel Alexis Virayie (born January 6, 1991 in Enghien-les-Bains, Val-d'Oise) is a French professional footballer currently playing for Ligue 1 team AJ Auxerre.

Career 
Virayie began his career with CS Sedan Ardennes and joined in summer 2008 to Pescara Calcio. After just a half year in the Serie C with Pescara Calcio turned back to France to sign with Entente SSG. Virayie turned after another half year in summer 2009 from Championnat National side Sannois Saint-Gratien to the Ligue 1 club AJ Auxerre, formerly had a short trial period in Greece with Panathinaikos F.C. on 6 June 2009.

References

1991 births
Living people
People from Enghien-les-Bains
French footballers
CS Sedan Ardennes players
Entente SSG players
Association football midfielders
Footballers from Val-d'Oise